Gershoy is a surname. Notable people with the surname include:

 Eugenie Gershoy (1901–1986), American sculptor and watercolorist
 Leo Gershoy (1897–1975), American professor of history

See also
 Gershon (disambiguation)